The 1997–98 season of the UEFA Cup Winners' Cup club football tournament was won by Chelsea in the final against Stuttgart.

Teams

Qualifying round

|}

Notes
Note 1: Ararat Yerevan were awarded a 3–0 win in the qualifying round first leg after Dinamo Batumi were found guilty of fielding an ineligible player — Sotogashvili. The match originally ended as a 4–2 win for Dinamo Batumi.

First leg

Second leg

APOEL won 7–1 on aggregate.

ÍBV won 4–0 on aggregate.

Legia Warsaw won 5–1 on aggregate.

Național București won 12–2 on aggregate.

Hapoel Be'er Sheva won 2–1 on aggregate.

Shakhtar Donetsk won 4–1 on aggregate.

Dinaburg won 2–0 on aggregate.

Kilmarnock won 3–2 on aggregate.

Red Star Belgrade won 3–1 on aggregate.

Zagreb won 4–1 on aggregate.

BVSC Budapest won 5–1 on aggregate.

Belshina Bobruisk won 5–2 on aggregate.

Primorje won 3–0 on aggregate.

Slovan Bratislava won 3–2 on aggregate.

Ararat Yerevan won 3–2 on aggregate.

First round

|}

First leg

Second leg

Kocaelispor won 3–0 on aggregate.

Sturm Graz won 4–0 on aggregate.

Stuttgart won 5–2 on aggregate.

Shakhtar Donetsk won 4–3 on aggregate.

Germinal Ekeren won 4–3 on aggregate.

Primorje won 2–1 on aggregate.

AEK Athens won 9–2 on aggregate.

Slavia Prague won 6–2 on aggregate.

Roda won 14–1 on aggregate.

Tromsø won 6–5 on aggregate.

Copenhagen won 5–0 on aggregate.

Lokomotiv Moscow won 5–1 on aggregate.

Chelsea won 4–0 on aggregate.

Nice won 4–2 on aggregate.

Real Betis won 4–0 on aggregate.

Vicenza won 3–1 on aggregate.

Second round

|}

First leg

Second leg

Chelsea won 9–4 on aggregate.

Stuttgart won 6–4 on aggregate.

Lokomotiv Moscow won 2–1 on aggregate.

Vicenza won 5–2 on aggregate.

Real Betis won 3–1 on aggregate.

AEK Athens won 2–1 on aggregate. 

3–3 on aggregate. Slavia Prague won on away goals.

Roda won 6–0 on aggregate.

Quarter-finals

|}

First leg

Second leg

Vicenza won 9–1 on aggregate.

Stuttgart won 3–1 on aggregate.

Lokomotiv Moscow won 2–1 on aggregate.

Chelsea won 5–2 on aggregate.

Semi-finals

|}

First leg

Second leg

Chelsea won 3–2 on aggregate.

Stuttgart won 3–1 on aggregate.

Final

Top goalscorers
The top goalscorers from the 1997–98 UEFA Cup Winners' Cup are as follows:

See also
1997–98 UEFA Champions League
1997–98 UEFA Cup
1997 UEFA Intertoto Cup

References

External links 
 1997-98 competition at UEFA website
 results at Rec.Sport.Soccer Statistics Foundation
  Cup Winners Cup Seasons 1997-98 – results, protocols
 Archive of old pages site UEFA Season 1997–98, written protocol games.

3
UEFA Cup Winners' Cup seasons